National Textile Corporation is a central public sector undertaking  under the ownership of Ministry of Textiles , Government of India It owns 23 working textile mills which produce yarn and fabric. The company was incorporated in April 1968.

NTC had made a turnaround within a short span to emerge as a debt-free company with a highly competitive revival strategy. Apart from re-branding, NTC had developed a new marketing and corporate strategy that included revamping of all NTC stores and setting up of new stores.

The National Textile Corporation Limited (NTC) was incorporated in April 1968 for managing the affairs of sick textile undertakings, in the private sector, taken over by the Government. Starting with 16 mills in 1968, this number gradually rose to 103 by 1972–73. In the year 1974 all these units were nationalised under the Sick Textile Undertakings (Nationalization) Act 1974. The number of units increased to 119 by 1995.

Looking to the reduced number of mills and in line with the contemporary industry's trend all 9 subsidiary companies have been merged with NTC-HC making it into a single Company w.e.f. 01.04.2006.
The present CMD is Shri Nihar Ranjan Dash.

NTC has so far closed 77 mills and has transferred 2 mills in the State of Pondicherry to the State Government of Pondicherry.

NTC is to modernise/set up 24 (22+2) mills by itself through generation of funds from the sale of its surplus assets and 16 (18–2) mills are to be revived through Joint Venture route.

NTC has modernised 18 mills so far and is in the process of setting up 3 Composite Textile Units of which one is an SEZ area. NTC would be setting up 1 Technical Textile Unit and modernising 2 more units taken out from the list of Joint Venture apart from going into Ginning & Garmenting by way of forward and backward integration to have a pressure in all components of the value chain.

References

External links

Manufacturing companies established in 1968
Government-owned companies of India
Companies based in Mumbai
Economy of Mumbai
Ministry of Textiles
Textile companies based in Maharashtra
Cotton industry in India
1968 establishments in Delhi